= Commons Park =

Public park in Denver, Colorado, U.S.

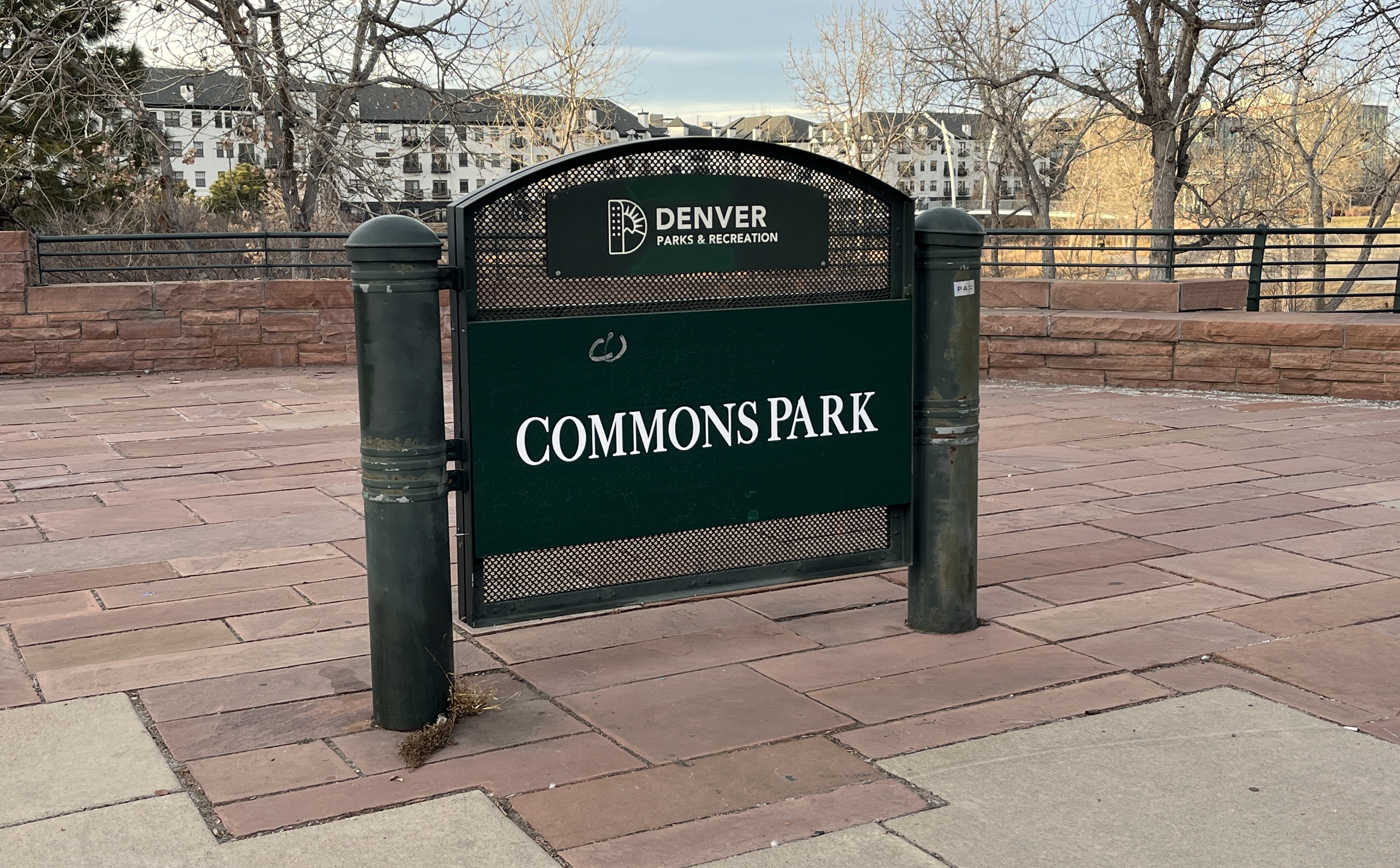
- Park sign, 2025
- Interactive map of Commons Park
- Location: Denver, Colorado, U.S.
- Coordinates: 39°45′26″N 105°0′19″W

Commons Park is a public park in Denver, Colorado, United States.

Part of the park is an AIDS memorial called The Grove. It was dedicated in 2000.

The park has hosted the Golden Hours Music Festival.
